Metoponiinae is a subfamily of owlet moths in the family Noctuidae. There are about 16 genera and more than 70 described species in Metoponiinae.

Genera
These 16 genera belong to the subfamily Metoponiinae:

 Aegle Hübner, 1823
 Axenus Grote, 1873
 Azenia Grote, 1882
 Cydosia Duncan & Westwood, 1841
 Epharmottomena John, 1909
 Flammona Walker, 1863
 Haemerosia Boisduval, 1840
 Metaponpneumata Möschler, 1890
 Metopoplus Christoph, 1893
 Mycteroplus Herrich-Schaffer, 1850
 Panemeria Hübner, 1823
 Pinacoplus Hampson, 1910
 Proschaliphora Hampson, 1901
 Sexserrata Barnes & Benjamin, 1922
 Synthymia Hübner, 1823
 Tristyla Smith, 1893

References

Further reading

 

Noctuidae